Service-oriented modeling  is the discipline of modeling business and software systems, for the purpose of designing and specifying service-oriented business systems within a variety of architectural styles and paradigms, such as application architecture, service-oriented architecture, microservices, and cloud computing.

Any service-oriented modeling method typically includes a modeling language that can be employed by both the "problem domain organization" (the business), and "solution domain organization" (the information technology department), whose unique perspectives typically influence the service development life-cycle strategy and the projects implemented using that strategy.

Service-oriented modeling typically strives to create models that provide a comprehensive view of the analysis, design, and architecture of all software entities in an organization, which can be understood by individuals with diverse levels of business and technical understanding. Service-oriented modeling typically encourages viewing software entities as "assets" (service-oriented assets), and refers to these assets collectively as "services." A key service design concern is to find the right service granularity both on the business (domain) level and on a technical (interface contract) level.

Popular approaches
Several approaches have been proposed specifically for designing and modeling services, including SDDM, SOMA and SOMF.

Service-oriented design and development methodology
Service-oriented design and development methodology (SDDM) is a fusion method created and compiled by M. Papazoglou and W.J. van den Heuvel. The paper argues that SOA designers and service developers cannot be expected to oversee a complex service-oriented development project without relying on a sound design and development methodology. It provides an overview of the methods and techniques used in service-oriented design, approaches the service development methodology from the point of view of both service producers and requesters, and reviews the range of SDDM elements that are available to these roles.

An update to SDDM was later published in Web Services and SOA: Principles and Technology by M. Papazoglou.

Service-oriented modeling and architecture
IBM announced service-oriented modeling and architecture (SOMA) as its SOA-related methodology in 2004 and published parts of it subsequently. SOMA refers to the more general domain of service modeling necessary to design and create SOA. SOMA covers a broader scope and implements service-oriented analysis and design (SOAD) through the identification, specification and realization of services, components that realize those services (a.k.a. "service components"), and flows that can be used to compose services.

SOMA includes an analysis and design method that extends traditional object-oriented and component-based analysis and design methods to include concerns relevant to and supporting SOA. It consists of three major phases of identification, specification and realization of the three main elements of SOA, namely, services, components that realize those services (aka service components) and flows that can be used to compose services.

SOMA is an end-to-end SOA method for the identification, specification, realization and implementation of services (including information services), components, flows (processes/composition). SOMA builds on current techniques in areas such as domain analysis, functional areas grouping, variability-oriented analysis (VOA) process modeling, component-based development, object-oriented analysis and design and use case modeling. SOMA introduces new techniques such as goal-service modeling, service model creation and a service litmus test to help determine the granularity of a service.

SOMA identifies services, component boundaries, flows, compositions, and information through complementary techniques which include domain decomposition, goal-service modeling and existing asset analysis.
The service lifecycle in SOMA consists of the phases of identification, specification, realization, implementation, deployment and management in which the fundamental building blocks of SOA are identified then refined and implemented in each phase. The fundamental building blocks of SOA consist of services, components, flows and related to them, information, policy and contracts.

Service-oriented modeling framework (SOMF)
 
SOMF has been devised by author Michael Bell as a holistic and anthropomorphic modeling language for software development that employs disciplines and a universal language to provide tactical and strategic solutions to enterprise problems. The term "holistic language" pertains to a modeling language that can be employed to design any application, business and technological environment, either local or distributed. This universality may include design of application-level and enterprise-level solutions, including SOA landscapes, cloud computing, or big data environments. The term "anthropomorphic", on the other hand, affiliates the SOMF language with intuitiveness of implementation and simplicity of usage. 

SOMF is a service-oriented development life cycle methodology, a discipline-specific modeling process. It offers a number of modeling practices and disciplines that contribute to a successful service-oriented life cycle development and modeling during a project (see image on left).

It illustrates the major elements that identify the “what to do” aspects of a service development scheme. These are the modeling pillars that will enable practitioners to craft an effective project plan and to identify the milestones of a service-oriented initiative—either a small or large-scale business or a technological venture.

The provided image thumb (on the left hand side) depicts the four sections of the modeling framework that identify the general direction and the corresponding units of work that make up a service-oriented modeling strategy: practices, environments, disciplines, and artifacts. These elements uncover the context of a modeling occupation and do not necessarily describe the process or the sequence of activities needed to fulfill modeling goals. These should be ironed out during the project plan – the service-oriented development life cycle strategy – that typically sets initiative boundaries, time frame, responsibilities and accountabilities, and achievable project milestones.

See also

 Domain-driven design
 Object-oriented analysis and design
 Service-oriented architecture
 Service granularity principle
 Unified Modeling Language

References

Further reading 
 Ali Arsanjani et al. (2008). "SOMA: A method for developing service-oriented solutions ". IBM systems Journal Oct 2008
 Michael Bell (2008). Service-Oriented Modeling: Service Analysis, Design, and Architecture. Wiley.
 Birol Berkem (2008). "From The Business Motivation Model (BMM) To Service Oriented Architecture (SOA)" In: Journal of Object Technology Vol 7, no. 8
 M. Brian Blake (2007). "Decomposing Composition: Service-Oriented Software Engineers". In: IEEE Software. Nov/Dec 2007. pp. 68–77.
 Michael P. Papazoglou, Web Services - Principles and Technology. Prentice Hall 2008, 
 Dick A. Quartel, Maarten W. Steen, Stanislav Pokraev, Marten J. Sinderen, COSMO: A conceptual framework for service modelling and refinement, Information Systems Frontiers, v.9 n.2-3, p. 225-244, July 2007
 Luba Cherbakov et al. (2006). "SOA in action inside IBM, Part 1: SOA case studies". IBM developerWorks

External links 

 Elements of Service-Oriented Analysis and Design, IBM developerWorks Web services zone, June 2004 
 
 
 
 

Service-oriented (business computing)
Enterprise modelling